SSN may refer to:

Broadcasting
Setanta Sports News, a former 24-hour sports news network in the United Kingdom
Sky Sports News, a 24-hour sports news network in the United Kingdom
Soul of the South Network, an African-American oriented TV Network that launched May 28, 2013
Scoil an Spioraid Naoimh, a primary school in Cork City Ireland
Scholars Strategy Network, an association of academics and researchers
SSN College of Engineering, an engineering institution located in the suburbs of Chennai, Tamil Nadu, India

Entertainment
Tom Clancy's SSN, a 1996 game by Clancy Interactive Entertainment describing the operations of a U.S. Navy attack submarine
SSN (novel), a 1996 novel by Tom Clancy based upon the game by the same name

Government
Servizio Sanitario Nazionale, Italy's national health service
Social Security number, an identification number used by the U.S. Social Security Administration
SSN (hull classification symbol), the United States Navy's hull classification symbol for a fast attack submarine, one that is propelled by nuclear energy
Servicio Sismológico Nacional, the Mexican National Seismological Service, UNAM, Mexico
South Sudan
Superintendencia de Seguros de la Nación, a government agency of Argentina overseeing insurance companies

Political
Socialist Solidarity Network, a Trotskyist group in the UK

Science
Superior Salivatory Nucleus

Technology
Secure Service Network, a network behind a firewall or IPS containing systems which can be accessed from both the internal and external networks, but cannot reach the internal network
Semantic Sensor Network, an ontology describing sensors and observations, and related concepts
SIM Serial Number, used to identify a mobile phone's SIM card
Subsystem number, used in the Signaling Connection and Control Part of Signaling System #7 routing
Surgical Segment Navigator, a system for computer-assisted surgery

Other
Space Surveillance Network, a multinational cooperative effort to monitor space activity and track earth-orbiting objects and satellites. 
Species Survival Network: a coalition of conservation organizations committed to the enforcement and enhancement of CITES, the Convention on International Trade in Endangered Species
The IATA code for Seoul Airbase
Stoom Stichting Nederland, a Dutch Railway Museum 
The Seed Savers' Network, an international not-for-profit seed-saving organisation founded in Australia.

See also
 SN (disambiguation)
 SS (disambiguation)